Pierre-Emmanuel Rome, professionally known as Barnabe or Barnabé, is a French painter based in France. He works in fine arts media and is known for paintings that border on pop art, hard-edge painting, and also surrealism.

Biography
Barnabe has been working on his art since he was a child. He was a keen participant in many artistic workshops, museum tours, and art exhibitions as a child. The theme he selected to work on in the year of his bachelor's degree in Applied Arts was contamination and proliferation in Art.

Barnabe in his early career developed a graphic process using three parallel lines and started a movement of contamination and accumulation. By penetrating the urban environment of Nice with his ghost, Barnabe took the first step in his evolution by entering the world of illicit street art. After relocating to Paris in 2015, he began a period of propaganda in the shape of posters across the French city, with the goal of contaminating society through art.

Artistic style
Barnabe has deconstructed his emblematic characters, as well as images, throughout his career while continuing the tradition of pop art, mixing art history and popular culture. His works consist of 60% aerosol spray, 20% acrylic paint, and 20% black acrylic ink.

Select exhibitions
 2015: Solo Show Comptoir de Nicole Nice Vernissage et exposition, Restaurant Le Comptoir de Nicole - Nice
 2016: Solo Show Edr Nice Art Gallery Exposition de Mai à Août 2016. Galerie Edr Architectural en partenariat avec Nice Art Gallery - Nice
 2017: Fresque Pour Le Cavalier, Restaurant Réalisation de fresques, Le Cavalier - PARIS 15e
 2017: Fresque En Collaboration Mairie De Nice Réalisation d’une fresque, pour la lutte contre la violence faite aux femmes - Nice
 2018: Solo Show, Sofitel Paris Arc De Triomphe Exposition de Mai à Août 2018 au Sofitel Paris Arc De Triomphe- Paris 8e
 2018: Show Ours Jayet, En Collaboration Exposition Décembre 2018 - Avenue Matignon, Paris 8e.
 2019: Salon Art Atlantique Salon d’exposition Novembre 2019 - LA ROCHELLE
 2019: Show Art Time Abidjan - Côte D’ivoire Exposition Février 2019 - Abidjan 
 2020: Fresque Abidjan - Côte D’ivoire Réalisation d’une fresque dans le quartier de cocody- Abidjan 
 2020: Nuit Des Églises Exposition Février 2020 - Nice
 2021: Solo Show - Yang Gallery Solo Show Yang gallery Octobre 2021 - Singapour
 2021: Exposition Dans Les Rues De Paris Exposition à la galerie Sakura Février-Mars 2021 - Paris
2022: Solo Show Dubai 2022 - broken mosaic - Arttime Gallery at foundry by emaar-May 11 - July 5, 2022

References

21st-century French painters

1994 births

Living people